Juranpur may refer to:

Juranpur Satipith, a Shakti Peetha in Nadia district, West Bengal, India
Juranpur, Nadia, a village in Nadia district, West Bengal, India